Milton Holbrook Sanford (August 29, 1813 – August 3, 1883) was an American businessman, lawyer, and owner/breeder of Thoroughbred racehorses.

Early life
Sanford was born in Medway, Massachusetts on August 29, 1813. He was the eldest of four children born to Sewall Sanford and Edena Holbrook. His younger brother was Brig.-Gen. Edwards S. Sanford.

Career
Sanford became one of the Medway's greatest benefactors. Sanford owned wool and cotton mills and made a fortune manufacturing blankets for the Union Army during the American Civil War. In 1883 he built the Sanford Textile Mill in Medway which still stands to this day as a condominium property.

Thoroughbred horse racing
Wealthy enough to satisfy his passion for Thoroughbred horse racing, Milton H. Sanford owned Preakness Stud at what today is the corner of Valley Road and Preakness Avenue in Preakness, New Jersey as well as the  Preakness Stud Farm in Lexington, Kentucky.

In the summer of 1868, following a day of racing at Saratoga Race Course, Milton Sanford hosted a now famous dinner party for horsemen and other distinguished guests at the Union Hall Hotel in Saratoga Springs, New York. During the evening, John W. Hunter suggested that the occasion be marked with the creation of a Stakes race  to be called the Dinner Party Stakes with a very substantial purse of  $15,000. It was agreed that the race be held in the fall of 1870 and be open to three-year-old colts and fillies at a distance of two miles (3 km). Maryland governor Oden Bowie was in attendance and he promised that if the race would be run in Maryland, he would see to it that a new racetrack would be built to host it. As a result, Pimlico Race Course in Baltimore was built and on October 25, 1870 a horse named Preakness owned by Milton Sanford won the inaugural Dinner Party Stakes. The Preakness Stakes, established at Pimlico Race Course in 1873, was named in honor of Sanford's horse.

In 1881, the sixty-eight-year-old Milton Sanford sold Preakness Stud in Kentucky to Daniel Swigert who renamed it Elmendorf Farm. He died less than two years later.

Personal life
He died less than two years later at his summerhouse at 72 Washington Street in Newport, Rhode Island. The property, designed by  William Ralph Emerson, is now a bed and breakfast called the Sanford-Covell Villa Marina 

Milton Sanford is buried in his birthplace of Medway, Massachusetts where Sanford Hall and Sanford Street are named in his honor.

References

External links
 Newport Historical Society information on Milton H. Sanford
 Medway, Massachusetts Public library
 Race name origins from the official Preakness Stakes website
 Thoroughbred Heritage.com information of Milton H. Sanford

1813 births
1883 deaths
19th-century American businesspeople
New Jersey lawyers
American racehorse owners and breeders
People from Medway, Massachusetts
Sportspeople from Norfolk County, Massachusetts
19th-century American lawyers